Jeanne Chesley Ashworth (July 1, 1938 – October 4, 2018) was an American speed skater who competed in the 1960 Winter Olympics, 1964 Winter Olympics and 1968 Winter Olympics. Ashworth competed in the first Olympic speed skating event for women. She won the bronze medal, finishing behind a German and Russian. During the late 1950s and 1960s, when Ashworth was at the height of her career, she won 11 national championships.

She was born in Burlington, Vermont. She lived near Lake Placid, where she ran her family toy and candy company. She died of pancreatic cancer on October 4, 2018.

Ashworth won the bronze medal at the 1960 Winter Olympics in speed skating. Ashworth died on October 4, 2018 in Wilmington, New York.

Personal records

Olympic results

References

External links
 Jeanne Ashworth  at SkateResults.com
 
 
 

1938 births
2018 deaths
American female speed skaters
Speed skaters at the 1960 Winter Olympics
Speed skaters at the 1964 Winter Olympics
Speed skaters at the 1968 Winter Olympics
Olympic bronze medalists for the United States in speed skating
Sportspeople from Burlington, Vermont
Medalists at the 1960 Winter Olympics
Deaths from pancreatic cancer
21st-century American women